Joseph Henry Druar (born September 5, 1962 in Buffalo, New York) is an American former ice dancer. He competed at the 1988 Winter Olympics with Susie Wynne. The duo won the gold medal at the U.S. Figure Skating Championships twice.

Results
(with Susie Wynne)

References

Navigation

American male ice dancers
Olympic figure skaters of the United States
Figure skaters at the 1988 Winter Olympics
1962 births
Living people
Goodwill Games medalists in figure skating
Competitors at the 1990 Goodwill Games